Samae-San Island (Ko Samae-San) is a small island in Sattahip District, Chonburi Province of Thailand.

Geography
Ko Samae San has a length of four kilometres and its maximum width is about one kilometre. The island is thickly wooded and uninhabited. Formerly there was a fishing village on Samae San Island, but it was vacated and the island now is under the control of the Royal Thai Navy. Some 1,240 families reside in the fishing village of Ban Samae-San on the mainland.  Administratively the islands belong to the Samae San Sub-district of Sattahip.

Islands
There are four main islands in the Samae San group. The northern cluster surrounds Samae San Island, while the southern subgroup is centered on Ko Chuang. Chuang Island has a small bay at its southern end. Hin Chalam (Shark Rock) is five kilometres to the south of the southern end of the group.

Preservation area 
The Ko Kham Undersea Park is part of a royal project of Princess Maha Chakri Sirindhorn that preserves the plants and animals of the sea and island. It is home to many kinds of fish, including bluespotted stingrays, moray eels, fusilier fish, angel fish and lionfish.

Tourism
Visitors are restricted, although tourist attractions on the island include fishing, swimming, bicycle riding and hiking. The islands are also well known for their diving areas. Since the island is within a military area, off-limits for casual tourists, booking has to be done through local travel agents.

See also
List of islands of Thailand

References

External links
 

Sattahip District
Islands of Thailand
Geography of Chonburi province